Bianca Andreescu was the defending champion, but chose not to participate this year.

Madison Brengle won the title, defeating Stefanie Vögele in the final, 6–1, 3–6, 6–2.

Seeds
All seeds received a bye into the second round.

Draw

Finals

Top half

Section 1

Section 2

Bottom half

Section 3

Section 4

Qualifying

Seeds

Qualifiers

Draw

First qualifier

Second qualifier

References

External links
Main Draw
Qualifying Draw

2020 WTA 125K series
2020 Women's Singles